This list of Union College alumni includes graduates of Union College in Schenectady, New York, United States who have achieved some notability or influence in the public or private spheres.  Such a list is necessarily selective, and perforce subjective.

Alumni list

 Samantha Littlefield Huntley, portrait artist

Select gallery

References

Bibliography
ANB: 

BDUSC: 
DAB: 

NCAB: 
UCAD: 
UUCC:

External links

Union Alumni Association

Union College alumni